Lisa Raymond and Samantha Stosur were the defending champions, but lost in the semifinals to Katarina Srebotnik and Ai Sugiyama.

Alicia Molik and Mara Santangelo won the title, defeating Srebotnik and Sugiyama in the final 7–6(7–5), 6–3.

Seeds

Draw

Finals

Top half

Section 1

Section 2

Bottom half

Section 3

Section 4

External links
Draw
2007 French Open – Women's draws and results at the International Tennis Federation

Women's Doubles
French Open by year – Women's doubles
French Open - Doubles
French Open - Doubles